Blessed Giovanni Liccio (c.1430 - 14 November 1511) was an Italian Roman Catholic priest and a professed member of the Order of Preachers. Liccio was a noted miracle worker and a pious preacher who was also known for his simple and ascetic manner of living. Liccio's miracles earned him the reputation of being a saint and devotion to him throughout the Sicilian cities spread.

On 25 April 1753 he was beatified after his cultus was approved.

Life
Giovanni Liccio was born around 1430 in Caccamo to a poor farmer. His mother died during childbirth. His father neglected the child; he fed him crushed pomegranates, all he could afford. Liccio's cries led to a female neighbor taking him to her home to feed him and left him next to the bedside of her husband who was paralyzed. As soon as Liccio was placed near him, the husband found that he could move. The neighbor told Liccio's father but the latter was dismissive and more concerned with the fact that she had taken his son without his permission. As soon as the child was taken the husband could no longer move. Liccio's father took this as a sign of the divine and allowed the neighbours to care for his son while he worked. After a short time, the man was once again able to walk.

As the child grew older, he was cared for by an aunt. Before he turned ten he was able to recite the canonical hours. On a trip to Palermo he went to have his confession heard in the church of Saint Zita of Lucca; the Blessed Pietro Geremia heard his confession and suggested that Liccio become a religious and pushed the idea across. Despite his initial feelings of doubt he joined the Order of Preachers in 1445 and was later ordained to the priesthood.

Once he was ordained he was sent to establish a priory devoted to Saint Zita of Lucca in Caccamo. He lacked funds for the construction, but in a vision an angel told him to "build on the foundations" that now existed. Finding an abandoned foundation of a church – Santa Maria degli Angeli – he took over the site, assuming this was what the angel meant. Liccio became prior at Caccamo.

Liccio gained the reputation of being a miracle worker for his healing people's deformities and injuries. On several occasions – for the workers – he doubled the amount of bread and wine available. He was made the provincial of all Dominican Sicilian houses. He was called to preach in Vicenza (1466–67) and in Naples (1479).

Liccio died in his hometown on 14 November 1511.

Veneration
Liccio was beatified on 25 April 1753 after Pope Benedict XIV approved his cultus as being a long-standing devotion across Palermo and other Sicilian cities. His remains lie in a silver and glass display in the church of Santa Maria degli Angeli in Caccamo, where it is carried in procession on the last Sunday of the year.

Patronage
Having been credited with healing three people whose sustained serious head injuries in accidents, he is the patron saint of head injuries.

Legacy
In 1925 a group of Sicilian immigrants in Chicago formed the Societa Beato Giovanni Liccio to carry on the traditions related to the hometown patron.

References

External links
Saints SQPN

1511 deaths
15th-century venerated Christians
15th-century Italian Roman Catholic priests
16th-century venerated Christians
16th-century Italian Roman Catholic priests
Angelic visionaries
Members of the Dominican Order
Italian beatified people
Clergy from Palermo
Miracle workers
Beatifications by Pope Benedict XIV
People from Caccamo